The 1971 Utah Redskins football team was an American football team that represented the University of Utah as a member of the Western Athletic Conference (WAC) during the 1971 NCAA University Division football season. In their fourth season under head coach Bill Meek, the Redskins compiled an overall record of 3–8 with a mark of 3–4 against conference opponents, placing in a three-way tie for fourth in the WAC. Home games were played on campus at Ute Stadium in Salt Lake City.

Schedule

Roster

After the season

NFL Draft
One Utah player was selected in the 1972 NFL Draft.

References

Utah
Utah Utes football seasons
Utah Redskins football